The 1974 New York Giants season was the franchise's 50th season in the National Football League. The Giants finished in last place in the National Football Conference East Division with a 2–12 record, the team's worst since 1966.

The Giants’ home venue in 1974 was the Yale Bowl in New Haven, Connecticut, and they were winless at home in seven games. They won only one of twelve games at the Yale Bowl in 1973 and 1974. The Giants played at Shea Stadium in Queens in 1975 and opened Giants Stadium in New Jersey in October 1976.

The 1974 Giants hold the distinction of being the first team to lose a regular season game in overtime. In week nine, the 2–6 Giants welcomed the cross-town rival Jets to the Yale Bowl. With the Giants leading 20–13 in the fourth quarter, Joe Namath faked a handoff to Emerson Boozer, then ran into the end zone for a touchdown which tied the score at 20–20, forcing overtime; previously, a game between the Pittsburgh Steelers and Denver Broncos had ended in a 35–35 tie. The Giants were denied a game-winning score when Pete Gogolak missed a 42-yard field goal attempt, despite protests from Gogolak that he had made the kick. The Jets subsequently won 26–20 on a five-yard pass from Namath to Boozer after 6:53 of play in the extra period.

Offseason

Draft

Roster

Schedule

Intra-division opponents are in bold text.

Game summaries

Week 3 at Cowboys

Week 9 vs Jets

Week 11 vs Cardinals

Standings

See also
1974 NFL season

References

New York Giants seasons
New York Giants
New York Giants season
History of New Haven, Connecticut
Sports in New Haven, Connecticut